The Xiaomi Mi 8 is a flagship Android smartphone developed by Xiaomi Inc. It was launched at an event held in Shenzhen, China as the successor to the Xiaomi Mi 6. The naming of the Xiaomi Mi 8 (skipping the Mi 7) is in celebration of Xiaomi Inc's eighth anniversary. The Mi 8 draws parallels to the iPhone X, as both the rear and front of the phone are replicated. This design was later carried on to the mid-range Redmi Note 6 Pro and Mi A2 Lite.

Specifications

Hardware 
The Xiaomi Mi 8 is powered by the Qualcomm Snapdragon 845 processor, with 6 GB LPDDR4X RAM and Adreno 630 GPU. It has a  FullHD plus AMOLED display. Storage options include 64 GB or 128 GB. The handset features a fingerprint scanner on the rear or on the screen under the display, in the Explorer Edition. It features a 3,400 mAh battery with a USB-C reversible connector which supports Quick Charge 4.0+. It has Gorilla Glass 5. It does not feature a 3.5mm headphone jack and comes with a USB-C to 3.5mm headphone jack adapter provided in the box. The Mi 8 includes a dual camera setup with a 12 MP wide angle lens sensor and a 12 MP telephoto lens sensor. The front camera has a 20 MP sensor with an aperture of f/2.0. The Mi 8 camera has an overall score of 99 and a photo score of 105 on DxOMark. Explorer Edition also introduces a 3D optical facial recognition with the standard IR Sensor for dark condition and a dual band GNSS which allows reception of L1 and L5 signals simultaneously.

Software 
It runs on Android 10, with Xiaomi's custom MIUI 11 skin which is upgradeable to MIUI 12.

References 

Android (operating system) devices
Mobile phones introduced in 2018
Mobile phones with multiple rear cameras
Mobile phones with 4K video recording
Discontinued flagship smartphones
Xiaomi smartphones